Renavi is a village in Sangli district, Maharashtra, India. It is 9  km away from vita. In renavi villagers are fully vegetarian. people here don't eat meat and maintain Vegetarianism. The village has one primary school and one high school. Named as Shree Revansiddha high school. Which is given name as there is the temple of god Shree Revanasiddha. Revansiddha Temple is a holistic divine temple dedicated to Lord Sri dev Revansiddhanath, a Nath panthiya yogi. It was built in the' 16th century and lies hardly three furlongs away from the village Renavi.
 
Renavi is celebrated for an old temple dedicated to Revan Siddh, a saint of repute, said to have been under the special favour of Lord Sri. Dattatraya and Lil a great favorite of the Lingayats, because Lord Sri dev Revansiddhanath met Sri Siddheshwar Maharaj, Main Saint of Lingayat at Gurubhet in Sholapur city & gave Diksha.
 
A temple is a conspicuous object on the south side of the Chiplun-Karad-Bijapur road as soon as the plateau is reached. To the east of this sacred shrine is Urul Siddh and to the west in a tunnel is Visvaradya. The story runs that the Revan mountain was formerly composed of five metals. White crystals are found in abundance on the mountain and these are used as bhasma by the devotees. Besides, soils of various colors are also found. As many as 84 tirhas or holy centers were believed to have been situated on this sacred mountain but all except six have disappeared. Those now in existence are a gomukh, two haranyak, and three flower gardens.

References

Villages in Sangli district